The 2018 FIBA U18 Women's European Championship Division B was the 14th edition of the Division B of the Women's European basketball championship for national under-18 teams. It was played in Austrian towns of Fürstenfeld, Güssing and Oberwart from 3 to 12 August 2018. Lithuania women's national under-18 basketball team won the tournament.

Participating teams

  (1st place, 2017 FIBA U18 Women's European Championship Division C)

  (16th place, 2017 FIBA U18 Women's European Championship Division A)

  (14th place, 2017 FIBA U18 Women's European Championship Division A)

  (15th place, 2017 FIBA U18 Women's European Championship Division A)

First round

Group A

Group B

Group C

Group D

17th–24th place playoffs

9th–16th place playoffs

Championship playoffs

Final standings

References

External links
FIBA official website

2018
2018–19 in European women's basketball
2018 in Austrian sport
International youth basketball competitions hosted by Austria
FIBA U18
August 2018 sports events in Europe